The second round of the women's team pursuit of the 2009–2010 UCI Track Cycling World Cup Classics took place in Melbourne, Australia on 21 November 2009. 11 teams participated in the contest.

Competition format
The women's team pursuit race consists of a 3 km race between two teams of three cyclists, starting on opposite sides of the track.  If one team catches the other, the race is over.

The tournament consisted of an initial qualifying round.  The top two teams in the qualifying round advanced to the gold medal match and the third and fourth teams advanced to the bronze medal race.

Schedule
Saturday 21 November
13:15-14:20 Qualifying
20:30-20:45 Finals
21:20-21:30 Victory Ceremony

Schedule from Tissottiming.com

Results

Qualifying

Results from Tissottiming.com.

Finals

Final bronze medal race

Results from Tissottiming.com.

Final gold medal race

Results from Tissottiming.com.

See also
 2009–2010 UCI Track Cycling World Cup Classics – Round 2 – Women's individual pursuit
 2009–2010 UCI Track Cycling World Cup Classics – Round 2 – Women's points race
 2009–2010 UCI Track Cycling World Cup Classics – Round 2 – Women's scratch race
 UCI Track Cycling World Cup Classics – Women's team pursuit

References

UCI Track Cycling World Cup – Women's team pursuit
UCI Track Cycling World Cup Classics Round 2 Womens team pursuit
Women's team pursuit (track cycling)
UCI Track Cycling World Cup Classics Round 2 Womens team pursuit